Se los chupó la bruja ("The Witch Suckled Them") is a 1958 Mexican horror comedy film directed by Jaime Salvador and starring the double act Viruta y Capulina (Marco Antonio Campos and Gaspar Henaine), Sonia Furió, and Octávio Arias.

Plot
Viruta and Capulina are two brothers who are trying to invent a system in which water works as a substitute for gas for vehicles. Don Caritino, their landlord, has tried to get their fourteen-month due rent. Viruta and Capulina refuse to pay their due rent, so Don Caritino proposes them to convince their goddaughter Gloria to date him, and he'll let them forget about the rent. But Viruta and Capulina are surprised when they are told they have inherited, along with their cousin Reynaldo, their great uncle's monetary estate and mansion in "El callejón de las ánimas". There is a hidden treasure in the mansion that their great uncle tried to find. The mansion's butler and his wife, urgingly tying to find the treasure, scare Viruta, Capulina, Gloria, and Reynaldo out of the house so that their plan they can go on with their searching. Their luck turns around when Reynaldo calls the sheriff to arrest the butler and his wife. Viruta and Capulina show their water-energy invention to the sheriff in the butler's car, but the butler had poured gasoline into the gas compartment a few moments before. So Capulina lights a match and pours it in, and an explosion occurs. The explosion cracked a column where the treasure was hidden, Viruta and Capulina found the treasure and gives some to the sheriff But Reynaldo's greatest treasure is Gloria (Viruta and Capulina's goddaughter), who has developed a romantic relationship with him.

Cast
Marco Antonio Campos as Viruta
Gaspar Henaine as Capulina
Sonia Furió as Gloria
Octávio Arias as Reynaldo
Yerye Beirute as the Superintendent
José Jasso as the Butler
Armando Arriola as don Caritino
Lupe Carriles as the Housekeeper 
Felipe de Flores as Policeman 
Armando Espinosa as Policeman 
Mario García "Harapos" as the Superintendent's secretary
Elia Mendéz as Gloria's personal assistant
Los Tres Caballeros as the musical trio of the Cisne Negro club
Alberto Catalá as Lawyer Bermejo (uncredited)

Reception
Production started and ended in 1957, and the film premiered in the Palacio Chino movie theater on February 26, 1958.

DVD release and restoration
Under the production of Tekila Films, the film was digitally remastered in sound and picture quality for exclusive release in DVD in 2008. Se los chupó la bruja was released in an eight-film four-disc pack entitled, "8 Exitasos de la Comedia". It was also released by itself in a one-disc DVD.

References

External links

1958 films
1958 horror films
1950s comedy horror films
Films directed by Jaime Salvador
1958 comedy films
Mexican comedy horror films
1950s Spanish-language films
1950s Mexican films